Nocardia brasiliensis is a species of Nocardia. As with most members of Actinomycetota, they contain high guanine and cytosine content. It can cause nocardiosis.

References

Further reading

External links
Type strain of Nocardia brasiliensis at BacDive -  the Bacterial Diversity Metadatabase

Mycobacteriales
Bacteria described in 1913